Manivannan (31 July 1953 – 15 June 2013) was an Indian film actor, director and writer. In a career spanning three decades, he went from being a story and dialogue writer for director Bharathiraja from 1980–82 to a successful director who throve in experimenting with different genres, before becoming an actor. With over 400 films to his name, Manivannan was one of the most experienced actors in the field and has directed exact 50 films. Manivannan was mainly a supporting actor in films and often played the comedian, supporting 
character and villain roles.

The following is Manivannan's filmography. He has worked as a director, script and dialogue writer and as an actor. Manivannan has acted in over 400 films and directed 50 films throughout his career.

As director and writer

As actor

1980s

1990s

2000s

2010s

Voice Artist

Playback singer

Television
 Ganga Yamuna Saraswati (Raj TV)
 Thirumagal (Kalaignar TV)
 Namma Kudumbam (Kalaignar TV)

References

External links
 
 Manivannan filmography at Cinesouth.com

Indian filmographies
Male actor filmographies